Adam Stachowiak may refer to:

 Adam Stachowiak (born 1986), Polish footballer
 Adam Stachowiak (cyclist) (born 1989), Polish racing cyclist

See also